John Ridgway or Ridgeway may refer to:

John Livsey Ridgway (1859–1947), American nature artist and brother of ornithologist Robert Ridgway
John Ridgway (comics) (born 1940), British comic artist
John Ridgway (sailor) (born 1938), British sailor and ocean rower
John Ridgeway (died 1560), MP for Dartmouth and Exeter
John Ridgeway III (born 1999), American football player